Iccus of Taranto (5th century BC) was a Magna Grecia Olympic athlete, a victor during the 84th Games (444 BC) or 70th Games (470 BC) according to older sources. He is considered the father of athletic dietology. He prepared himself physically before competing according to ethical-religious Pythagorean concepts by abstaining from sexual intercourse and a frugal diet specially prepared. He also taught these principles. Pausanias calls him the best gymnast of his age, and Plato also mentions him with great praise. Iamblichus calls him a Pythagorean, and, according to Themistius, Plato reckoned him among the sophists.

References

5th-century BC Greek people
5th-century BC philosophers
Ancient Greek sportspeople
Ancient Olympic competitors
Ancient Tarantines
Pythagoreans of Magna Graecia